Duboce and Noe station (also known as Sunset Tunnel East Portal and Duboce Park) is a light rail stop on the Muni Metro N Judah line, located inside Duboce Park at the east portal of the Sunset Tunnel in San Francisco, California. The eastern portal of the Sunset Tunnel is located just west of the station. The station opened with the N Judah line on October 21, 1928.

The station has two side platforms located along the southern edge of Duboce Park with two mini-high platforms at the Sunset Tunnel portal which provide access to both lines for people with disabilities.

The stop is also served by the  route which provides service along the N Judah line during the early morning when trains do not operate. Unlike all other N Judah stops and stations, the  bus route does not stop at this station, instead staying on Haight Street, about two blocks away.

References

External links 

SFMTA – Sunset Tunnel East Portal inbound and outbound
SFBay Transit (unofficial) – Sunset Tunnel East Portal

Muni Metro stations
Western Addition, San Francisco
Railway stations in the United States opened in 1928